Julien Vidot (born 4 December 1982, in Perigord) is a French racing driver. He has competed in such series as Euro Formula 3000, World Series by Nissan/Lights and the Formula Chrysler Euroseries.

References

External links
 

1982 births
Living people
French racing drivers

Victory Engineering drivers
Graff Racing drivers